Walid Abu Al-Sel (born 1963) is a Syrian former football forward who played for Syria in the 1984 and 1988 editions of the AFC Asian Cup.

References
Stats

1963 births
Living people
People from Izra District
Syrian footballers
Syria international footballers
Competitors at the 1987 Mediterranean Games
Mediterranean Games gold medalists for Syria
1984 AFC Asian Cup players
1988 AFC Asian Cup players
Association football forwards
Mediterranean Games medalists in football
Syrian Premier League players
Al-Jaish Damascus players
tishreen SC players
saham SC players